Calamotropha robustella is a moth in the family Crambidae. It was described by Snellen in 1872. It is found in Angola.

References

Crambinae
Moths described in 1872
Taxa named by Samuel Constantinus Snellen van Vollenhoven